Juan Jesús Piñero Bolarín (born 13 July 1988), known as Pico, is a Spanish footballer who plays for CA Pulpileño as a forward.

Football career
Born in Mula, Region of Murcia, Pico was a product of local Real Murcia's youth system. On 17 June 2006, before even having appeared for the reserves, he made his professional debut, coming on as a substitute for Samuel in the 62nd minute of a 1–1 away draw against Sporting de Gijón in the Segunda División.

Pico was later assigned to the B-side in the Tercera División, and was loaned to UD Ibiza-Eivissa on 29 January 2008, until June. He subsequently returned to his parent club, and alternated between the reserves and the first team during his spell, scoring a goal for the latter on 20 June 2009 in a 1–2 loss at Córdoba CF.

Pico left Murcia in summer 2010 and joined another reserve team, Getafe CF B of the Segunda División B. He subsequently resumed his career in the same level but also in the fourth tier, representing Caravaca CF, UCAM Murcia CF, Orihuela CF, CF Lorca Deportiva and Real Jaén.

References

External links

1988 births
Living people
People from Río Mula
Spanish footballers
Footballers from the Region of Murcia
Association football forwards
Segunda División players
Segunda División B players
Tercera División players
Real Murcia players
Real Murcia Imperial players
Getafe CF B players
Caravaca CF players
UCAM Murcia CF players
Orihuela CF players
Real Jaén footballers